Toluca is an unincorporated community in Lincoln and Cleveland counties, North Carolina, United States.

References

Unincorporated communities in North Carolina
Unincorporated communities in Lincoln County, North Carolina
Unincorporated communities in Cleveland County, North Carolina